Ernst Möller (19 August 1891 – 8 November 1916) was a German international footballer.

References

1891 births
1916 deaths
Association football forwards
German footballers
Germany international footballers
Holstein Kiel players
German military personnel killed in World War I